The Sony E PZ 16-50mm F3.5-5.6 OSS is a variable maximum aperture standard zoom lens for the Sony E-mount, announced by Sony on September 12, 2012, and released January 2013. The lens is often bundled with various Sony Alpha mirrorless cameras as a "kit lens".

Build quality
The lens features a compact construction colloquially referred to as a "pancake lens" and a micromotor-driven power zoom controlled by a switch on the side of the lens and the dual-role focus/zoom ring when the camera is not set to manual focus. Given the lens' focal length of 16-50mm, it is generally regarded as a multipurpose lens, though underperforms in low light situations due to its slower variable minimum aperture of f/3.5-5.6.

Image quality
The lens has a tendency to produce somewhat soft images, especially near the corners of the image throughout its zoom range. Through the in-lens corrective programming, chromatic aberration and vignetting are reduced by the camera. Vignetting always remains visible with uniform backgrounds, especially at 16mm and always requires out-of-camera correction for applications like product photography. Lens distortion can be seen through at the 16mm end of its zoom range, but gradually fades away toward the 50mm end.

See also
List of Sony E-mount lenses
Sony E 18-55mm F3.5-5.6 OSS
Sony E 16-70mm F4 ZA OSS

References

Camera lenses introduced in 2012
16-50
Pancake lenses